The Cochabamba Bolivia Temple is the 82nd operating temple of the Church of Jesus Christ of Latter-day Saints (LDS Church).

Bolivia's first convert to the LDS Church was baptized in December 1964, a month after missionaries first arrived. Forty-four years later there were over 158,000 members across the country.

History
In 1995, the church announced that a temple would be built in the Bolivian city of Cochabamba. The next year, church president Gordon B. Hinckley presided over the groundbreaking. He addressed the 4,000 people gathered during one of the heaviest rainstorms the area had seen in ten years. He addressed the gathering, "My beloved and wet brothers and sisters".

Before the temple was dedicated it was open for one week to allow the public to tour the temple. Originally the temple open house had been scheduled for two weeks, but because of civil unrest in the city of Cochabamba, due to an ill-fated attempt to privatize the municipal water supply (Cochabamba protests of 2000), the first week was cancelled. LDS Church leaders were pleased when nearly 65,000 people toured the temple, coming close to the goal of 75,000. Because of the open house, over 2,200 people requested to be visited by the Mormon missionaries.

Hinckley dedicated the Cochabamba Bolivia Temple in four sessions on April 30, 2000. In the dedicatory prayer, Hinckley recognized the founder of Bolivia, Simón Bolívar, who died the year the church was organized.

The Cochabama Bolivia Temple is of classic modern design reflecting the Bolivian culture. The exterior is finished with a blend of hand-hewn granite and plaster. A statue of the angel Moroni tops the single tower.

In 2020, the Cochabamba Bolivia Temple was temporarily closed temporarily during the year in response to the coronavirus pandemic.

See also

 Jay E. Jensen, temple president (2013–)
 Comparison of temples of The Church of Jesus Christ of Latter-day Saints
 List of temples of The Church of Jesus Christ of Latter-day Saints
 List of temples of The Church of Jesus Christ of Latter-day Saints by geographic region
 Temple architecture (Latter-day Saints)
 The Church of Jesus Christ of Latter-day Saints in Bolivia

References

Additional reading

External links
 Official Cochabamba Bolivia Temple page
 Cochabamba Bolivia Temple page

20th-century Latter Day Saint temples
Religious buildings and structures in Bolivia
Temples (LDS Church) completed in 2000
Temples (LDS Church) in Latin America
Temples (LDS Church) in South America
The Church of Jesus Christ of Latter-day Saints in Bolivia
2000 establishments in Bolivia
Buildings and structures in Cochabamba